Phineas Newborn Jr. Plays Harold Arlen's Music from Jamaica is an album by American jazz pianist Phineas Newborn Jr. recorded in 1957 and released on the RCA Victor label. The album features Newborn's interpretations of compositions from the Broadway musical Jamaica.

Reception
The Allmusic review awarded the album 3 stars.

Track listing
All compositions by Harold Arlen and Yip Harburg
 "Savannah" – 4:10
 "Little Biscuit" – 3:03
 "Cocoanut Sweet" – 4:23
 "Push de Button" – 4:23
 "Napoleon" – 4:20
 "Hooray for de Yankee Dollar" – 3:31
 "For Every Fish" – 3:47
 "Take It Slow, Joe" – 4:20
 "Pity the Sunset" – 4:07
 "Pretty to Walk With" – 2:52

Personnel
Phineas Newborn Jr. – piano
Ernie Royal (tracks 2, 4 & 6-9), Nick Ferrante (tracks 1, 3, 5 & 10) – trumpet
Jimmy Cleveland – trombone
Jerome Richardson – tenor saxophone, flute
Sahib Shihab – baritone saxophone, alto saxophone, clarinet, bass clarinet
Les Spann – guitar
George Duvivier – bass
Osie Johnson – drums
Francisco Pozo, Willie Rodriguez – congas, bongos, timbale
A. K. Salim – arranger

References

RCA Records albums
Phineas Newborn Jr. albums
1957 albums